Gerald Krefetz (died 27 January 2006) was an American author specializing in financial topics.

Personal life
He was married to Ruth Marossi Krefetz. Together the couple had Adriene and Nadine.

Career
Krefetz wrote on the economic status of Jewish communities in America and on antisemitism. In 1961, Krefetz was noted for calling attention to the lack of material about the Holocaust in American school textbooks.

Books
Money makes money: and the money money makes makes more money, 1970
Jews and money: the myths and the reality, 1982
The Parents Guide to Paying for College, 1999
The Basics of Stocks, 2005
The Basics of Speculating, 2005
The Basics of Investing, 2005
How to Read and Profit from Financial News,  1995
Investing Abroad
Leverage, 1986
The Book of Incomes, 1982
The Dying Dollar, 1972
The Smart Investors Guide, 1982

References

Year of birth missing
2006 deaths
American businesspeople
American finance and investment writers
American self-help writers
Jewish American writers
21st-century American Jews